Éric Breton (born 1954, Avignon) is a French composer. Since 1994, he has made several compositions for the Sarajevo Philharmonic Orchestra.

Works
 Poèmes espagnols
 Messe d'Avignon, 2003

References

External links
Composer website - discography

Living people
1954 births
French composers
French male composers
Musicians from Avignon